John Barry Mason  (12 July 1935 – 16 April 2021) was an English singer and songwriter. A leading songwriter of the 1960s, he wrote the bulk of his most successful songs in partnership with Les Reed.  Mason gained many gold and platinum awards for his work including five Ivor Novello Awards, the most recent of them in 1998.

Life and career
Mason was born in Wigan, eldest son of Phyllis née Hart, and journalist, Cecil Mason, who died when Barry was nine.  He had a younger brother, Max, and two half-sisters, Lynn & Diane, by his mother's second husband, an American GI.  He grew up in the village of Coppull, near Chorley in Lancashire. His songwriting credits included three UK Singles Chart number ones, "Love Grows (Where My Rosemary Goes)", "The Last Waltz", and "I Pretend", as well as "Here It Comes Again", "There Goes My First Love", "A Man Without Love", "Winter World of Love" "Now That You are Gone", "Rowbottom Square", "Delilah", "Love Is All", and "You Just Might See Me Cry".

His songs have been recorded by Tom Jones, Dalida, P. J. Proby, David Essex, The Drifters, Rod Stewart, Petula Clark, Perry Como, Elvis Presley, Engelbert Humperdinck, The Fortunes, Charles Aznavour, Tony Christie, Connie Francis, Mireille Mathieu, Barbra Streisand, The Dave Clark Five, Cliff Portwood, Malcolm Roberts, Our Kid and Ashley Maclaine.

Mason credited his start in songwriting to his first hit in 1960 as a producer. "I met this boy called Tommy Bruce and I spent my last few pounds making a demo of him singing an old Fats Waller song, Ain't Misbehavin' – and he had a hit (No.3, UK, 1960). Suddenly, I was his manager, not knowing anything about the business. But the important thing was, I was in the business." Mason and Reed wrote a song for Kathy Kirby, "I'll Try Not to Cry", as part of A Song for Europe 1965, the BBC's contest to choose the United Kingdom entry for that year's Eurovision Song Contest in Naples. The song was beaten by "I Belong". "The Last Waltz" became a million-selling UK number one for  Humperdinck in September 1967. In 1968, the duo scored another UK number 1 hit with Des O'Connor's recording of "I Pretend". Mason and Reed also wrote "Who's Doctor Who", a novelty song recorded by Doctor Who star Frazer Hines in 1967, but it failed to chart. They also wrote "Marching on Together" (aka "Leeds! Leeds! Leeds!"), the anthem of Leeds United F.C. His last chart topping song was "Love Grows (Where My Rosemary Goes), for session group,  Edison Lighthouse, in January 1970.

He was the major songwriter for the English singer Declan Galbraith for his first album Declan (2002), including the hit "Tell Me Why" (No. 29 in UK) and "Till the Day We Meet Again".

He founded his own publishing company, Barry Mason Enterprises Ltd.

Mason was a frequent guest on the BBC1 panel game Pop Quiz, hosted by Mike Read.

He was appointed Member of the Order of the British Empire (MBE) in the 2020 Birthday Honours for services to music.

Personal life
Barry Mason had two daughters, Aimi and Maggie and a son, Tyler.  He died in April 2021, survived by his sisters Lynn and Diane and long-term partner Vanessa Martin.

Discography

Albums
The Songwriter (1976), Magnet
The Singer and the Songs (1978), Magnet

References

External links
 Barry Mason official website
 
 
 Interview with Barry Mason in International Songwriters Association's Songwriter Magazine

1935 births
2021 deaths
people from Wigan
English male singers
English songwriters
Ivor Novello Award winners
Castlebar Song Contest winners
Members of the Order of the British Empire
Musicians from Lancashire